African Women Footballer of the Year, an annual award for Africa's best female football player. It is awarded by the Confederation of African Football (CAF) in December each year. Nigeria's Asisat Oshoala has won the award a record five times. The award was given out for the first time in 2001.

Winners
2001  – Mercy Akide, Nigeria
2002  – Alberta Sackey, Ghana
2003 – Adjoa Bayor, Ghana
2004 – Perpetua Nkwocha, Nigeria
2005 – Perpetua Nkwocha, Nigeria
2006 – Cynthia Uwak, Nigeria
2007 – Cynthia Uwak, Nigeria
2008 – Noko Matlou, South Africa
2009 – not awarded
2010 – Perpetua Nkwocha, Nigeria
2011 – Perpetua Nkwocha, Nigeria
2012 – Genoveva Añonma, Equatorial Guinea
2013 – not awarded
2014 – Asisat Oshoala, Nigeria
2015 – Gaëlle Enganamouit, Cameroon
2016 – Asisat Oshoala, Nigeria
2017 – Asisat Oshoala, Nigeria
2018 – Thembi Kgatlana, South Africa
2019 – Asisat Oshoala, Nigeria
2022 – Asisat Oshoala, Nigeria

Multiple winners 
* Players in bold are currently active

Awards won by nationality

See also

 List of sports awards honoring women

References

African football trophies and awards
Women's association football player of the year awards
Africa 2